

A drift line or wrack line, also known as a wash margin or wash fringe is an area of the shore on which material is deposited or washed up. It often runs along the margin of a waterbody and there can be several bands due to variations in water levels. As a result of the richness of nutrients that occur in such wash fringes, ruderal species frequently occur here, that, for example, on the Baltic Sea coast consist of grassleaf orache and sea kale.

See also 
High water mark
Intertidal zone

References

Literature 
 Leser, Hartmut, ed. (2005). Wörterbuch Allgemeine Geographie, 13th ed., Deutsche Taschenbuch Verlag, Munich, .

External links 

 Information on wash margin vegetation by the Wattenmeer Nature Conservation Station
What is the STRANDLINE?, durhambiodiversity.org.uk
Strandline Description (English), eunis.eea.europa.eu
Soil seed bank and driftline composition along a successional gradient on a temperate salt marsh, bioone.org
Page 9: "Setting: Intertidal Zones" in: Effects of Coastal Armoring on Sandy Beach Ecosystems, wa.water.usgs.gov

Geomorphology
Beaches